Mohammad-Hossein Dadras is an Iranian regular military (Artesh) officer with the rank of brigadier who currently serves as the second-in-command.

Career
Dadras previously served as the commander of Islamic Republic of Iran Army Ground Forces and Coordinating Deputy of the Islamic Republic of Iran Army.

References

Commanders of Islamic Republic of Iran Army Ground Force
Islamic Republic of Iran Army personnel of the Iran–Iraq War
Islamic Republic of Iran Army brigadier generals